Levanna is an unincorporated community in Union Township, Brown County, in the U.S. state of Ohio.

History
The first settlement at Levanna was made in 1799. A post office called Levanna opened in 1822, closed in 1831, reopened in 1867, and closed permanently in 1932.

References

Unincorporated communities in Brown County, Ohio
1799 establishments in the Northwest Territory
Unincorporated communities in Ohio